The 1966 Paris–Tours was the 60th edition of the Paris–Tours cycle race and was held on 9 October 1966. The race started in Paris and finished in Tours. The race was won by Guido Reybrouck.

General classification

References

1966 in French sport
1966
1966 Super Prestige Pernod
October 1966 sports events in Europe